Oleh Viktorovych Volotyok (born 15 August 1967) is a former Ukrainian professional footballer.

Club career
He made his professional debut in the Soviet First League in 1984 for FC Zarya Voroshilovgrad. He played 3 games in the 1991–92 European Cup for FC Dynamo Kyiv.

Honours
 Ukrainian Premier League champion: 1993.
 Ukrainian Premier League runner-up: 1992.

References

External links
 Oleg Volotek. Luhansk Our Football. archived.

1967 births
People from Novocherkassk
Living people
Russian emigrants to Ukraine
Soviet footballers
Ukrainian footballers
Ukrainian expatriate footballers
Expatriate footballers in Russia
Expatriate footballers in Germany
Expatriate footballers in Finland
Ukrainian Premier League players
Russian Premier League players
FC Zorya Luhansk players
FC Dynamo Kyiv players
FC Dynamo-2 Kyiv players
SKA Kiev players
FC Asmaral Moscow players
MFC Mykolaiv players
FC Fakel Varva players
FC Kryvbas Kryvyi Rih players
FC Mariupol players
FC Torpedo Zaporizhzhia players
FC Hoverla Uzhhorod players
SV Babelsberg 03 players
FC Stal Alchevsk players
TP-47 players
FC Yednist Plysky players
FC Irpin Horenychi players
FC Bucha players
FC Krystal Chortkiv players
Association football defenders
Association football midfielders
Association football forwards
FC Yenisey Krasnoyarsk players
Sportspeople from Rostov Oblast